The ULPower UL390i is a Belgian aircraft engine, designed and produced by ULPower Aero Engines of Geluveld for use in homebuilt aircraft.

Design and development
The engine is a six-cylinder four-stroke, horizontally-opposed,  displacement, air-cooled, direct-drive, gasoline engine design. It employs dual electronic ignition and produces  at 3300 rpm.

Variants
UL390i
Base model with fuel injection and a compression ratio of 8.2:1, producing  at 3300 rpm
UL390iS
Model with fuel injection and a 9.1:1 compression ratio, producing  at 3300 rpm
UL390iA
Inverted oil system version of the UL390iS, producing  at 3300 rpm

Specifications (UL390i)

See also

References

External links

ULPower aircraft engines
Air-cooled aircraft piston engines
2010s aircraft piston engines